CricketGraph was a graphic software program for the Apple Macintosh by Cricket Software sold until 1996. It could take tabulated data and create common business and statistics graphs such as bar chart, pie chart, scatter plots and radial plots. These graphs could be saved in common image formats such as PICT and EPS and added to other documents. It did not have the same capabilities as a spreadsheet.

Competition
The main competitor was Visual Business, as well as the built-in graphing packages in Microsoft Excel, Informix Wingz and specialty statistics software such as Systat.

Although this package was written cleanly enough to run on much later versions of Classic Mac OS,   the feature set was eventually superseded by packages such as DataGraph, DeltaGraph and KaleidaGraph.

See also
List of information graphics software

References

Plotting software
Classic Mac OS software